Guido Trenti (born December 27, 1972 in Milan) is an American-Italian former professional road racing cyclist who has ridden in each of the three Grand Tours.

Trenti was born to an American mother and Italian father, allowing him to maintain dual citizenship. In 2001, he became the first American to win a stage at the Vuelta a España.
In 2002, Trenti represented the United States at the World Cycling Championships, mainly because he was not selected by the Italian team.

He lives in Mussolente during the racing season.

Major results 
Sources:

2000
 1st Stage 9 Tour de Langkawi
2001
 1st Stage 19 Vuelta a España (Cuenca > Guadalajara)
 2nd Giro del Friuli
2002
 3rd Gran Premio della Costa Etruschi

Grand Tour general classification results timeline

References

External links
  
 
 Cyclingnews.com 2002 Interview

1972 births
Living people
Cyclists from Milan
American people of Italian descent
American male cyclists
American Vuelta a España stage winners
Italian male cyclists